"London Boy" is a song by American singer-songwriter Taylor Swift from her seventh studio album, Lover (2019). The song was written and produced by Swift, Jack Antonoff, and Sounwave, the latter of whom served as a co-producer. It gives additional writing credit to Cautious Clay, as a result of an interpolation of Clay's song "Cold War". An upbeat bubblegum pop song with reggae influences, it is about an infatuation with a love interest from London, inspired by Swift's experiences in the city.

The lyrics of "London Boy" name-check a range of locations and cultural icons associated with London, from a perspective of a woman from Tennessee, U.S. It features a spoken-word intro by Idris Elba. The song received favorable comments from general music critics, but a mixed reception from British critics, who complimented the production but felt the lyrics do not represent London properly. Upon the release of Lover, it charted on the singles charts of Australia, Canada, and the U.S. Swift performed the song live on BBC Radio 1's Live Lounge and at Capital FM's Jingle Bell Ball.

Background and production 

Taylor Swift released Lover on August 23, 2019, through Republic Records. Described by Swift as a "love letter to love itself", Lover explores the "full spectrum of love", inspired by the connection she felt to her fans during her Reputation Stadium Tour (2018). The track list of the album consists of 18 songs. "London Boy" was written and produced by Swift, Jack Antonoff, and Sounwave, with additional writing credit for R&B musician Cautious Clay, a result of an interpolation of Clay's 2018 song "Cold War". The song was recorded at Electric Lady Studios in New York.

Cautious Clay was contacted by Swift's team in June 2019, prior to Lover release, when he was on tour in Bergen, Norway. Swift wanted to interpolate "Cold War" into "London Boy", which he happily accepted. "Cold War" was written and produced entirely by Cautious Clay in June 2017, after he had attended the annual Coney Island Mermaid Parade in Brooklyn. He told Rolling Stone: "[...] I don't know anything about her, really, so, to me, that she would feel it was appropriate to include that interpolation is just pretty surreal."

Music and lyrics 
Musically, "London Boy" is a Britpop and bubblegum pop song, featuring layers of synthesizers and repetitive beats. The song incorporates a minimal, upbeat production, with elements of reggae. It contains an interpolation of "Cold War" by Cautious Clay. Lyrically, "London Boy" was inspired by Swift's appreciation of the city of London, England. Swift described the overall inspiration: "With this song, I just kind of wrote about, basically, what it was like to basically be like, 'Bye guys! I'm gonna go here for a long time.' "

The lyrics describe a Tennessean woman's infatuation for a "London boy", and name-check a series of locations and cultural icons typically associated with her own American culture and the love interest's English culture. The beginning features a spoken-word by English actor Idris Elba from when he appeared on The Late Late Show with James Corden in 2017. Throughout the song, Swift mentions Motown Records, Southern California, Bruce Springsteen, Tennessee whiskey, and "American smile" as examples of her own culture, and name-checks the London tourist spots of Shoreditch, Camden Market, Soho, Hackney, Brixton, Bond Street, and the West End. The love interest is a resident of Highgate, a neighborhood associated with old money and wealth. Swift expresses enjoyment of several cultural activities in London, including having an evening high tea, hearing "stories from uni", and watching rugby at a pub. At one point, Swift declares that she is "a Tennessee Stella McCartney", referencing the fashion designer with whom Swift launched a Lover-inspired sustainable clothing line.

Reception and live performances
Roisin O'Connor of The Independent called "London Boy" one of the most divisive tracks of Lover, adding that "a lot of Brits are taking issue with the lyrics, as they're essentially a tourist's guide to where-not-to-visit in London". She ranked the song 37th on her list of Swift's 100 best album tracks. Jon Caramanica of The New York Times selected the song as one of Lover weakest moments. In a review for Slate, Carl Wilson thought that the London references are annoying and ineffective. Shon Faye from Dazed similarly expressed distaste towards the lyrics, but noted that it was justifiable for Swift, an American, to have a "wide-eyed naivety" embraced by first-timers in London. Sarah Carson from i lauded the catchy production of "London Boy", but dismissed the lyrics as one of the album's "concessions to silliness and gimmicks". On the positive side, Keira Leonard of The Music complimented the track's lighthearted and rather silly nature. Nick Levine from NME agreed, and opined that the song is not to be taken seriously for its "clumsy fun" sentiments. In The Irish Times, Louis Bruton selected "London Boy" as one of the album's most cheerful songs.

Swift performed "London Boy" for the first time during BBC Radio 1's Live Lounge on September 2, 2019. She later included the song on the set list of her performance at Capital FM's Jingle Bell Ball in London on December 8, 2019.

Credits and personnel
Credits are adapted from the liner notes of Lover.

 Taylor Swift – vocals, songwriter, producer
 Jack Antonoff – producer, songwriter, programming, recording, percussion, bass, keyboard
 Sounwave – co-producer, songwriter
 Cautious Clay – songwriter, interpolation 
 Laura Sisk – recording
 John Rooney – assistant recording
 Jon Sher – assistant recording
 Nick Mills – assistant recording
 John Hanes – engineer
 Mikey Freedom Hart – keyboard
 Evan Smith – keyboard, saxophone
 Sean Hutchinson – drums
 Serban Ghenea – mixing
 Randy Merrill – mastering
 Idris Elba – guest intro
 James Corden – guest intro

Charts
Upon the release of Lover, "London Boy" entered the official singles charts in Australia (ARIA Singles Chart—peaking at number 42), Canada (Canadian Hot 100—peaking at number 54), and the U.S. (Billboard Hot 100—at number 62). It also entered and peaked at number 47 on the UK Streaming Chart, a component of the UK Singles Chart.

Certifications

References

External links

2019 songs
Taylor Swift songs
Songs written by Taylor Swift
Song recordings produced by Taylor Swift
Songs written by Jack Antonoff
Song recordings produced by Jack Antonoff
Songs about London
Britpop songs
Bubblegum pop songs
Songs written by Sounwave